Boat Harbour is a rural locality in the local government area (LGA) of Waratah–Wynyard in the North-west and west LGA region of Tasmania. The 2016 census has a population of 273 for the state suburb of Boat Harbour.

History 
Boat Harbour was gazetted as a locality in 1966.

Geography
The waters of Bass Strait form most of the northern boundary, the exception being the locality of Boat Harbour Beach. The Flowerdale River forms much of the southern boundary.

Road infrastructure 
The Bass Highway (Route A2) passes through from east to south-west. Route C231 (Gates Road) starts at an intersection with A2 and runs south until it exits. Route C232 (Port Road) starts at an intersection with A2 and runs north to the locality of Boat Harbour Beach. Route C233 (Sisters Beach Road) starts at an intersection with C232 and runs west until it exits.

References

Towns in Tasmania
Localities of Waratah–Wynyard Council